Stanley Omah Didia (born 19 May 1997), known professionally as Omah Lay, is a Nigerian singer and songwriter. He gained widespread recognition in early 2020 after his self-produced single, "Holiday", went viral on social media.

Early life 
Stanley Omah Didia was raised in the Nigerian city of Port Harcourt. He was born on May 19 1997, He hails from Ikwerre, Rivers Local Government Area in Rivers State. He attended Comprehensive High School in Rivers State before proceeding to the University of Port Harcourt. He comes from a musical family and his grandfather played instruments for the singer Celestine Ukwu before he died in 1977. Lay's father played the drums.

Career 
Lay started out in a rap group under the stage name "Lil King." He later moved on to songwriting and music producing, which went largely uncredited, and as a result of that, he released "Do Not Disturb" in April 2019. "Hello Brother" was released a month after.

He signed to a record label named KeyQaad in June 2019, and took a seven month break. During the break, he worked on his debut EP, Get Layd. He told OkayAfrica, "I started working on it August [of 2019]. At some point I had to go off social media, stay away from a lot of things and keep my head straight to get the project right. The first song I'd recorded on Get Layd was 'Bad Influence.' I'd done that way before the songs we had to put on the project." Following the break, he released "Bad Influence," which became the most streamed Nigerian song on Apple Music at the end of 2020.

On 14 February 2020, Lay released "You," his first official single. He released his five-track debut EP, Get Layd on 22 May 2020. The EP peaked at number one on the Nigerian Apple Music charts. All five songs from the EP reached the top 15 of the Apple Music charts for Nigeria, with "You" peaking at number one.

In October, Lay appeared on Olamide's album Carpe Diem, on the track "Infinity", which topped the Apple Music charts for Nigeria.

On 20 November, Lay released his second five-track EP, What Have We Done. All five tracks reached the top 12 of the Apple Music charts for Nigeria, with "Godly" reaching number one.

On 3 July 2020, Lay was the first artist highlighted for Apple's Africa Rising Campaign to spotlight African talent. In December 2020, he was included in BBC Radio 1Xtra's annual "Hot for 2021" list. He was the first African artist featured on Audiomack's #Up Now program for emerging artists; was included in Montreux Jazz Festival's "20 artists to watch in 2021"; and was named BET's Amplified International Artist of the Month for November 2020. He is currently signed to Dvpper Music Distribution in Nigeria, and Sire Records for international distribution. He was nominated in four categories at the 2020 Headies Awards, winning the Next Rated award.

On 25 June 2021, Lay was featured alongside fellow Nigerian singer Alpha P on Nigerian producer Masterkraft's official remix of Canadian singer Justin Bieber's single, "Peaches". On 8 July 2021, Lay released a new single, "Understand". On 3 March 2022, he released a collaboration with Bieber, "Attention", which serves as the second collaboration between the two artists.

Controversy 
On 14 December 2020, Lay was arrested alongside Tems after they performed in a show in Uganda. The Ugandan Police authority identified violation of COVID-19 lockdown protocols as the reason for their arrests. The artists felt they were set up. Two days later, the Ugandan government released the two, apologised for the arrests and cleared them of wrongdoing.

Political views 

Lay has expressed his support for the #EndSARS campaign in Nigeria. He told Harper's Bazaar, "People need to know these protests are purely about the people, with no political undertone whatsoever. Police harass, extort, beat, and kill us just for being young and trendy, with no consequences. This has gone on long enough, and we are saying enough is enough and demanding government action."

Discography

Studio albums

Extended plays

Singles

As lead artist

As featured artist

Guest appearances

Production discography

2018 
Kidoben Ace
 "Caught Up"

2019 
Klug Ali
 "Opium"

Sikiboi
 "One Day"

2020 
Omah Lay – Get Layd
2. "Lo Lo"
4. "Bad Influence"

Moveek
 "Flossin"

Omah Lay – What Have We Done
4. "Confession"

2021 
Jhay Jhay
 "Welcum Party"

Awards and nominations

References 

Living people
21st-century Nigerian singers
1997 births